Dasarathi Tah (1911–1980) was a politician and journalist in the Indian state of West Bengal.

Early life
Dasarathi Tah did not have the benefit of any formal education and was a completely self-educated person. Politically inclined from his younger days, he joined the Congress Party in 1930 and actively participated in many political movements such as the Salt Satyagraha, personal satyagraha, flood prevention in the Damodar, and the canal movement. During the Quit India Movement he was involved in the occupation of Jamalpur police station. He was sent to jail several times for his political activities.

Elections
He won elections to the West Bengal state assembly from Raina constituency in 1951, 1957 and 1967. While he contested on a Kisan Mazdoor Praja Party ticket in 1951, he fought the other elections on a Praja Socialist Party ticket.

Journalist
Dasarathi Tah was a pioneering journalist. He edited and published the weekly Damodar before independence and then started the daily Damodar after independence. Both were the earliest in their category in Bardhaman district.

References

Bengali politicians
People from Purba Bardhaman district
1980 deaths
1911 births
Praja Socialist Party politicians
20th-century Indian politicians